Stefan Edberg defeated Andre Agassi in the final, 6–4, 5–7, 7–6(7–1), 7–6(8–6) to win the men's singles tennis title at the 1990 Indian Wells Masters.

Miloslav Mečíř was the defending champion, but lost in the first round to Richey Reneberg.

Seeds
The top eight seeds received a bye into the second round.

  Boris Becker (semifinals)
  Stefan Edberg (champion)
  Brad Gilbert (third round)
  Aaron Krickstein (quarterfinals)
  Michael Chang (withdrew)
  Andre Agassi (final)
  Tim Mayotte (second round)
  Jay Berger (quarterfinals)
  Mats Wilander (first round)
  Martín Jaite (first round)
  Alberto Mancini (first round)
  Andrés Gómez (first round)
  Pete Sampras (second round)
  Emilio Sánchez (quarterfinals)
  Andrei Chesnokov (first round)
  Horst Skoff (third round)

Draw

Finals

Top half

Section 1

Section 2

Bottom half

Section 3

Section 4

References
 1990 Newsweek Champions Cup Draw - Men's Singles

Newsweek Champions Cup - Singles